Chlorcyclizine (Di-Paralene, Mantadil, Pruresidine, Trihistan) is a first-generation antihistamine of the diphenylmethylpiperazine group marketed in the United States and certain other countries. It is used primarily to treat allergy symptoms such as rhinitis, urticaria, and pruritus, and may also be used as an antiemetic. In addition to its antihistamine effects, chlorcyclizine also has some anticholinergic, antiserotonergic, and local anesthetic properties.  It also has been studied as a potential treatment for various flaviviruses like Hepatitis C and Zika Virus.

See also 
 Cyclizine
 Homochlorcyclizine
 Meclizine

References

H1 receptor antagonists
Chloroarenes
Cyclizines
Chlorcyclizines